Against War and Fascism may refer to:

 American League Against War and Fascism
 FIGHT against War and Fascism
 Movement Against War and Fascism, Australia
 Work Against War and Fascism, Finland
 World Committee Against War and Fascism